John Gardiner (9 September 1798 – 16 November 1878) was a banker and pastoralist in the early part of British settlement of Melbourne and Australia. In 1836, he established a settlement near the junction of the Yarra River and Kooyongkoot Creek, which was later renamed after him.

Personal life and biography 

Gardiner was born in Dublin, Ireland. At Colp, County Meath, on 9 September 1822 he married Mary Eagle. In October, accompanied by his wife, her parents and their three sons, he sailed for Van Diemen's Land (now Tasmania) in the Andromeda. He arrived in Hobart in May 1823 and was soon granted  near Ross, Tasmania.
In 1824, he accepted employment as a clerk with Bank of Van Diemen's Land. His only child, Anna Maria, was born in Hobart in July 1827. During March 1828, he left the bank to become a successful store-keeper in the Macquarie River district.
In 1835, Gardiner, lost his tenancy and sailed for Sydney. He looked for land about Yass but was discouraged by the severe drought. In 1836, he returned to Van Diemen's Land then visited the one year old Port Phillip settlement and returned once more to Sydney. There he bought 300 head of cattle from Joseph Hawdon. Both he and John Hepburn drove the cattle overland to his Gardiner's Creek run, near Melbourne. Because of this journey, the first with stock, Gardiner is often called an 'Overlander'. Leaving his cattle and men at Gardiners Creek he returned immediately to Sydney and arranged to send 200 more cattle to Port Phillip. In 1837, less than two years after Batman’s landing and within weeks of the formal laying out of Melbourne, Gardiner was searching for stray cattle from his cattle run which extended over most of present-day Hawthorn, when he discovered the upper Yarra regions (towards Lilydale). In 1838, he took out a grazing licence for a run bounded on three sides by Running Creek (later Ryrie's Creek, now Olinda Creek), the Yarra River and Mount Corhanwarrabul. (The second most highest peak of the Dandenong Ranges).
John Gardiner, together with his cousin, William Fletcher, and David Gardiner, established the run – approximately 15,000 acres, with grazing capabilities for 1300 head of cattle. The run included today's Lilydale, Croydon North and Mooroolbark. Gardiner himself spent little time there, instead staying close to his Gardiners Creek homestead where, as it is recorded in his wife’s diary, he had trouble with the local Aboriginal people spearing his cattle.
In September 1842, Melbourne encountered its first financial crisis. Gardiner left and returned to England, where he retired to Leamington Spa, Warwickshire. In March 1863, his wife, who had stayed in Melbourne with her daughter, died. Three months later, Gardiner married his cousin Sarah Fletcher. He died on 16 November 1878 at Leamington Spa.

Legacy 

Several features of Melbourne have been named after John Gardiner, including:
 Gardiner's Creek A waterway in the eastern suburbs of Melbourne, and part of the Yarra River catchment. In Gardiner's time, the creek was known as Kooyongkoot.
 John Gardiner Reserve A park in Booroondara, the site of a former quarry
 John Gardiner Secondary College a secondary school, now closed. Auburn High School now occupies the site.
 Gardiner Road A road in Booroondara
John Gardiner Rover Crew A Rover Scout Unit located in Ferndale Park, Glen Iris

References 

 A. S. Kenyon, 'The Overlanders', Victorian Historical Magazine, 10 (1924–25)
 Leslie J. Wilmoth, 'Gardiner, John (1798–1878)', Australian Dictionary of Biography, Volume 1, MUP, 1966, p. 425.

Settlers of Australia
1798 births
1878 deaths
Australian pastoralists
19th-century Australian businesspeople